The Jeonju Yi clan is a Korean clan with the surname Yi. Their Bon-gwan is in Jeonju, North Jeolla Province. The clan includes the former House of Yi which ruled the Joseon dynasty and the Korean Empire.

Their founder was Yi Han. His descendant, Yi Seong-gye, seized power in a military coup and founded Joseon in 14th century. 

According to history books published during the Joseon period such as Veritable Records of the Joseon Dynasty, he was Minister of Works during the Silla Dynasty and became the ancestor of a prestigious and powerful clan that held influence from the Unified Silla period to the Goryeo period. On the other hand, there were records that he was an immigrant from China. This is because the Jeonju Yi clan's record named Wansan Silrok said that Yi Han originally lived in China, but he later came to Silla. Moreover, another record named Origin of Yi clan said that Yi Han was originally a descendant of Tang Dynasty's imperial family and lived in Jeonju after he came to Silla.

In the 21st century, the Jeonju Lee Royal Family Association manages the affairs of the clan.

Notable people
 Lee Ji-eun, (better known as IU), South Korean singer-songwriter and actress
 Lee Tae-min, South Korean singer, member of boy band Shinee
 Lee Jin-ki, South Korean singer, member of boy band Shinee
 Lee Donghae, South Korean singer, member of boy band Super Junior
 Lee Jun-ho, South Korean singer-songwriter and actor, member of boy band 2PM
 Mark Lee Korean-Canadian rapper, member of boy band NCT
 Lee Ahyumi, South Korean singer and actress, former member of girl group Sugar
 Lee Seung-gi, South Korean actor, singer and TV personality
 Lee Nak-yon, South Korean politician, former Prime Minister of South Korea
 Lee In-je, South Korean politician and former judge
 Lee Hun-jai, South Korean politician
 Lee Hwi-jae, South Korean comedian and TV personality
 Lee Jung-jae, South Korean actor
 Lee Hong-bin, South Korean singer and actor, former member of boy band VIXX
 Lee Hong-koo, South Korean academic and politician, former Prime Minister of South Korea and founding Chairman of the East Asia Institute
 Lee Hoi-chang, South Korean lawyer and politician, former Prime Minister of South Korea and former Justice of the Supreme Court of Korea
 Lee Hee-ho, South Korean women's rights activist, former First Lady of South Korea
 Lee Jin-wook, South Korean actor
 Lee Beom-seok, Korean independence activist and first Prime Minister of South Korea
 Lee Ki-poong, South Korean politician
 Lee Byung-hun, South Korean actor
 Yi Kwang-su, Korean writer and independence activist
 Syngman Rhee, South Korean politician and first President of South Korea
 Yi Tjoune, Korean prosecutor and diplomat
 Prince Imperial Heung, prince of the Joseon dynasty and of the Korean Empire
 Yi Je-ma, Korean medicine scholar during the late Joseon period
 Heungseon Daewongun, father of Emperor Gojong and regent of Joseon
 Yi Su-gwang, Joseon military official and diplomat
 Yi Eokgi, Joseon naval commander during the Imjin War
 Yi Ui-bang, military ruler of Korea during the Goryeo period
 Yi Seok, Joseon history professor, grandson of Emperor Gojong
 Lee Se-young, South Korean actress
 Lee Yo-Won, South Korean actress
 Lee Kyung-kyu, South Korean comedian and actor

See also 
 House of Yi
 Lee (Korean surname)

References